Daniel Ketchum (born October 7, 1981) is an American former swimmer and Olympic gold medalist.  At the 2004 Summer Olympics in Athens, Greece, Ketchum earned a gold medal by swimming for the winning U.S. team in the men's 4×200-meter freestyle relay.

Ketchum spent two years in Ireland from 1994 to 1996, where he was educated at Villiers School. He swam for the Cincinnati Marlins swim club as an age group swimmer, and later for Sycamore High School in Cincinnati.  While swimming for Sycamore High, he won six individual Ohio state swimming championships in 1998, 1999 and 2000—three each in the 200-yard and 500-yard freestyle events.  He then attended the University of Michigan, where he swam for the Michigan Wolverines swimming and diving team in National Collegiate Athletic Association (NCAA) competition.  He was a member of Michigan's NCAA national championship team in the 800-meter freestyle relay, together with Peter Vanderkaay, Davis Tarwater and Andrew Hurd, in 2004.

He assumed the role of head coach of the swim team at Loveland High School starting in the 2009-10 high school swim season.  During his first season as head coach he led the Tigers to their best results in history at the 2010 OHHSA Swimming and Diving Championship Meet where his boys finished seventh overall and the girls finished 14th overall.

See also
 List of Olympic medalists in swimming (men)
 List of University of Michigan alumni

References

External links
 
 
 
 

1981 births
Living people
American male freestyle swimmers
Michigan Wolverines men's swimmers
Olympic gold medalists for the United States in swimming
Swimmers from Cincinnati
Swimmers at the 2004 Summer Olympics
Medalists at the FINA World Swimming Championships (25 m)
Medalists at the 2004 Summer Olympics
Pan American Games silver medalists for the United States
Pan American Games medalists in swimming
Universiade medalists in swimming
People educated at Villiers School
Swimmers at the 2003 Pan American Games
Universiade bronze medalists for the United States
Medalists at the 2001 Summer Universiade
Medalists at the 2003 Pan American Games